Husain Mahfoodh (born 29 June 2001) is a Bahraini handball player for Al-Najma and the Bahraini national team.

He represented Bahrain at the 2019 World Men's Handball Championship and at the delayed 2020 Summer Olympics.

References

External links
 
 

2001 births
Living people
Bahraini male handball players
Olympic handball players of Bahrain
Handball players at the 2020 Summer Olympics
21st-century Bahraini people